Sodium tetrathionate is a salt of sodium and tetrathionate with the formula Na2S4O6.H2O. The salt normally is obtained as the dihydrate ( = 2). It is a colorless, water-soluble solid. It is a member of the polythionates, which have the general formula [S(SO3)2]2-. Other members include trithionite ( = 1), pentathionate ( = 3), hexathionate ( = 4).

Sodium tetrathionate is formed by the oxidation of sodium thiosulfate (Na2S2O3), e.g. by the action of iodine:
2 Na2S2O3  +  I2  →   Na2S4O6  +  2 NaI
The reaction is signaled by the decoloration of iodine. This reaction is the basis of iodometric titrations.

Other methods include the coupling of sodium bisulfite with disulfur dichloride:
2 NaHSO3  +  S2Cl2   →   Na2S4O6  +  2 HCl

The ion has ideal C2 symmetry, like H2S2. The S-S-S dihedral angle is nearly 90°. The central S-S distance is 2.115 Å, 0.01 Å longer than the two other S-S distances as well as those distances in most polysulfanes.

References

Tetrathionates